Amos J. Hochstein (born January 4, 1973) is a U.S. businessman, diplomat, and lobbyist. He has worked in the U.S. Congress, has testified before congressional panels and has served in the Barack Obama administration under Secretaries of State Clinton and Kerry. He was appointed Deputy Assistant Secretary of State in 2011 and as Special Envoy and Coordinator for International Energy Affairs. In 2015, President Barack Obama nominated Hochstein to be the Assistant Secretary of State for Energy Resources but the Senate did not act on the nomination.

While at the State Department, Hochstein worked as a close advisor to Vice-President Joe Biden. He served in the administration from 2011 to 2017.

In March 2017, he joined Tellurian, a private Houston-based LNG company, where he served as Senior Vice President Marketing until his departure in September of 2020. He serves on the boards of the Atlantic Council and U.S.-India Business Council. Hochstein is a former member of the supervisory board of Ukrainian Naftogaz, from which he resigned in October 2020 by writing an opinion piece that highlighted the return of sabotage in the form of corrupt forces.

On August 10, 2021, United States Secretary of State Antony Blinken announced that he is appointing Hochstein as the Senior Advisor for Energy Security, and he was subsequently appointed Special Presidential Coordinator for Global Infrastructure and Energy Security.

Biography
Hochstein was born in Israel, the child of American Jewish immigrants.  He began working as a foreign policy adviser to Democratic Party members of the U.S. government House Foreign Affairs Committee from 1994 to January 2001. He identifies as a Modern Orthodox Jew. He is married to Julie Rae Ringel; they have four children together and live in Washington D.C. His wife works for the Georgetown University Continuing Education School in the executive leadership coaching program.

Career

Advising Congress
On Capitol Hill, Hochstein first served on the U.S. House Committee on Foreign Affairs staff. In subsequent years he served in a variety of senior level positions, including the House International Relations Committee, where he served as Senior Policy Advisor. In 1997, he later was sent to North Korea to report on the country's economic and military status as well as the progress and opportunities for humanitarian relief efforts.

Later, Hochstein served as the Senior Policy Advisor to the Foreign Affairs Committee of the U.S. House of Representatives. Hochstein first served as the principal Democratic staff person on the Economic Policy, Trade & Environment Subcommittee where he oversaw work authorizing Ex-Im Bank, OPIC and USTDA, as well as drafting legislation on export controls and trade-related multilateral organizations and regimes.

Hochstein also worked as a Senior Policy Advisor to then-Governor Mark Warner, and later as Policy Director for Senator Chris Dodd. He joined Dodd's team in the beginning of 2007 and was the Policy Director during his 2008 Presidential campaign.

Hochstein was also an aide to Representative Sam Gejdenson. During his time on Capitol Hill, Hochstein travelled to Iraq and was involved in U.S. back-channel diplomatic discussions to potentially lift U.S. economic sanctions in exchange for the potential resettlement of several thousand Palestinian refugees in Central Iraq. Hochstein argued that the economic sanctions had to be maintained while conceding that it was necessary to "humanise" those sanctions.

Cassidy & Associates
Hochstein later moved to the private sector as Executive Vice President of International Operations at Cassidy & Associates. Throughout his career, he was a counselor and lobbyist for both domestic and international oil and gas companies, as well as companies focusing on renewable energy. In this capacity, he assisted corporations in assessing potential new markets and the development of alternative sources of power.

While working at Cassidy & Associates, Hochstein also worked on the account of the President of Equatorial Guinea, Teodoro Obiang Nguema, Africa's longest serving dictator, to improve the relationship with the United States. In his book "Private Empire: ExxonMobil and American Power", two times Pulitzer Prize winner Steve Coll recounts, that while Hochstein initially was uncomfortable with the Equatorial Guinea account, he assisted in the development of a "road map" of political changes together with the U.S. National Security Council, that Equatorial Guinea would have to implement in order to display their political sincerity to change and to improve relations with the United States. The outlines involved prisoner releases, substantial public investments in health care and education and Hochstein coordinated the communication of these points with and between Equatorial Guinea's leadership and the State Department. Hochstein and others, among them Secretary of State Condoleezza Rice and Paul Wolfowitz, said they were convinced by Obiang's will to change and adapt. Equatorial Guinea under the Obiang regime remains by many accounts one of the world's least free countries. Hochstein defended the Obiang regime in an interview with the Washington Post. He stated that the development and support of the democratic process in countries like Equatorial Guinea must be supported and that Western states cannot expect changes of long-standing political realities overnight. Eventually Hochstein resigned from the lobbying account but continued to work for Cassidy until 2006.

Energy diplomat for the Obama Administration
Hochstein began working at the U.S. Department of State in 2011, joining the newly formed Bureau of Energy Resources. Serving as deputy to Special Envoy Carlos Pascual, Hochstein worked to help Ukraine find new supplies of natural gas in the wake of the 2014 Russian invasion.

He oversaw the Office of Middle East, Asia and Europe, the Western Hemisphere and Africa. Hochstein led the energy related diplomacy efforts.

Special Envoy and Coordinator of International Energy Affairs 
On August 1, 2014, Hochstein succeeded Carlos Pascual as acting Special Envoy and Coordinator of International Energy Affairs, and was permanently appointed to the position later in the year by Secretary Kerry. As the Special Envoy, Hochstein oversaw the Bureau of Energy Resources and advised Secretary of State John Kerry on global energy security and diplomacy, as well as integration of renewable and clean energy and related security matters. He also worked closely with officials at the White House's National Security Council and other government agencies.

In his capacity as the U.S.'s Chief Energy Diplomat, Hochstein had an important role in shaping foreign energy and security policy and worked closely with U.S. Vice President Joe Biden, accompanying him on international travel and advancing energy as a key US foreign policy tool.  Hochstein and Biden worked together on the Caribbean Energy Security Initiative, Central America Energy Security Task Force, Cyprus and East Mediterranean, as well as securing Ukraine and Europe from Russian energy dominance.

Hochstein encouraged European countries to find new oil, gas, coal, and nuclear sources, to alleviate their dependence on Russian energy. In response to President Vladimir Putin's plans for new gas pipelines to bypass an existing transit coordinator through Ukraine towards Greece and Italy, Hochstein described the plans as "political projects that have questionable economic value" to the European energy market. He has also stated that the U.S.'s position isn't to exclude Russia from the European market entirely, but rather that Russia should be an equal player, remarking that "European countries should be able to choose their supplier and force their suppliers to compete for their business. That is what is good for energy security of Europe, economic security and ultimately for the national security of those countries involved."

Hochstein has also been involved in the U.S. front against the Islamic State of Iraq and the Levant, specifically cutting their oil revenues by disrupting their production lines. Hochstein oversaw the U.S. efforts to cripple Islamic State's energy business by weakening oil trade between ISIS, the Syrian government and other parties. His team coordinated with the U.S. Department of Defense to determine targets. Airstrikes subsequently blew up over 1,000 tanker trucks and  other key targets. In a testimony before the Senate Foreign Relations Committee, Hochstein described the military actions as "not only more bombings, but a different kind of bombing."

Hochstein's energy diplomacy efforts in the Middle East have been critical. Former Prime Minister Benjamin Netanyahu cited Hochstein's work as helping to provide an incentive for the renewed relationship between Israel and Turkey.  This followed his work to revive efforts to settle maritime border dispute between Lebanon and Israel.  At the conclusion of his visit, Hochstein made statements stressing his visit was to discuss delayed gas exploration in Lebanon.  In October 2022, Amos Hochstein, managed to negotiate a maritime deal between Lebanon and Israel following months of negotiations, settling the Israeli–Lebanese maritime border dispute. The previous year, 2014, Hochstein helped “pave the way” for the $500 million natural gas agreement between Israel and Jordan  visiting Jordan 14 times and was, alongside Israel's former President Shimon Peres, a "key broker" for the gas export deal.  This agreement concluded an effort that Secretary of State Clinton began in 2011.

In response to Russian officials claiming that the Turkish government was illegally buying oil from the Islamic State, Hochstein dismissed these claims, saying that "I do not believe there is significant smuggling between ISIL-controlled areas and Turkey of oil of any significant volume."

Hochstein has also worked on multilateral energy affairs, meeting with Urban Rusnák, Secretary-General of the Energy Charter Conference, to discuss progress on the Energy Charter Process, discussing the advance of clean energy investments and energy security with government officials in India and meeting several other state leaders and government officials to coordinate energy and security matters with states like Azerbaijan and Saudi Arabia and other states in the Middle East.

Assistant Secretary of State for Energy Resources 
On October 8, 2015, President Barack Obama nominated Hochstein to be the Assistant Secretary of State for Energy Resources, the official chief position for the bureau. Hochstein continued his efforts in all previously engaged fields of national and international energy and security matters, including Iran sanctions, energy opportunities in Latin America, the US-India energy cooperation, the US-China energy cooperation, the administration's strategy on Russia, and the fight against ISIS.

He also was involved in discussing and mapping out details of the Southern Gas Corridor project generally and the Trans Adriatic Pipeline with Greece specifically.

He authored the White House Caribbean Energy Security Initiative and chaired President Obama's U.S.-Caribbean and U.S.-Central America Energy Security Task Force. He also continued to lead U.S. efforts to promote global fuel switching to natural gas and develop stronger natural gas markets in Asia and South Asia. He headed the State Department's Unconventional Gas Technical Engagement Program, formerly known as Global Shale Gas Initiative.

He was succeeded by Frank R. Fannon, now Assistant Secretary of State for Energy Resources.

Since leaving the White House, Hochstein appeared on a Trump White House panel promoting the use of fossil fuels at the 2016 Bonn Climate Change Conference.

Executive at Tellurian 
In 2017 Hochstein joined Tellurian, a private LNG-gas company and today serves as EVP of Marketing. He has left Tellurian to pursue other endeavors.

Senior Advisor on Energy Security for Biden Administration 
Serving in various diplomatic positions for the United States government, according to the US state department in 2021, he is not a dual-national. According to the Washington Post, Hochstein is a close aide of President Biden, serving as his "energy whisperer." Former US State Department official David Goldwyn said that Hochstein acts as “the person who bridges State, Treasury, the White House and Energy.” Hochstein was the lead mediator in brokering an agreement to resolve a decades-long dispute Israel and Lebanon surrounding the two countries' maritime border and the gas fields located there. Israeli Prime Minister Yair Lapid tweeted: "On behalf of the State of Israel, I thank American mediator @AmosHochstein for his hard work to bring about this historic agreement."

Energy and Foreign Policy Positions 
Hochstein sees renewable energies as very important and being at the center of both the future's energy market and US energy policy. He is of the opinion, that the realistic transition into a fully renewable resourced energy mix, will take some time and that the use of cleaner resources (e.g. LNG to replace heavy crude oils) for this transition period is crucial to sustain economic developments and growth. Hochstein said: "Here in Washington, I think we are the last city on the planet…where we still talk about fossil fuel versus renewables as some kind of zero-sum game […] It is not one or the other. It is going to have to be both because we are going to need the baseload and we are going to need the fuels that will transition us to the future."

At the 2015 Renewable Energy Transition event hosted by the International Renewable Energy Agency (IRENA) and the Atlantic Council's Global Energy Center, Hochstein stated that "unlike oil and gas, the technological advances we’re seeing in renewables are making them cheaper and better." He further said: "U.S. energy security, energy sustainability and climate objectives are mutually reinforcing. As such, we are working to promote energy efficiency, conservation and transformation of energy systems. We are encouraging market reforms, such as the elimination of fossil fuel subsidies, that can address overall energy demand."

Hochstein has been interviewed by national and international media, commenting on national and international energy policy, energy security, and foreign policy. Due to environmental and economic considerations, the Biden administration and the subject have opposed the proposed EastMed pipeline in favor of an Egyptian route.

Memberships 
Hochstein serves on the board of the Atlantic Council and the U.S.-Indian Business Council.

Hochstein is a former member of the supervisory board of the Ukrainian energy company Naftogaz. He was appointed in 2017 and resigned in October 2020 claiming that the company was returning to corrupted practices.

In October 2019 Hochstein was mentioned by former U.S. officials in relation to the Trump–Ukraine scandal. It was reported that as early as May 2019 Hochstein alerted the National Security Council staff that Rudy Giuliani and Gordon Sondland's pressure tactics were rattling Ukrainian president Volodymyr Zelensky. It was also reported that Rick Perry planned to have Hochstein replaced as a member of the board at Naftogaz with someone aligned with Republican interests. Perry denied the reports.

References

External links

1973 births
American lobbyists
American Orthodox Jews
American people of Israeli descent
Energy policy of the United States
Biden administration personnel
Living people
Petroleum politics
Place of birth missing (living people)
United States Department of State officials
United States Special Envoys
Washington, D.C., Democrats